Mauro Alejandro Brasil Alcaire (born 27 April 1999) is a Uruguayan professional footballer who plays as a defender for Primera División club Cerro Largo.

Career
A youth academy product of El Tanque Sisley, Brasil made his professional debut on 18 September 2017 in a 1–0 defeat against Boston River. He scored his first goal in next match on 8 October 2017, in a 1–1 draw against Montevideo Wanderers.

Peñarol signed Brasil ahead of 2018 season and subsequently loaned him out to Rampla Juniors, Cerro and Cerro Largo. He made his continental debut during his loan spell at Rampla, in a 4–0 Copa Sudamericana win against Peruvian side UT Cajamarca.

References

1999 births
Living people
Footballers from Montevideo
Association football defenders
Uruguayan footballers
Uruguayan Primera División players
El Tanque Sisley players
Rampla Juniors players
C.A. Cerro players
Cerro Largo F.C. players